Joseph Stennett (1663 – 11 July 1713) was an English Seventh Day Baptist minister and hymnwriter.

Youth and marriage

Joseph Stennett was born in 1663 at Abingdon, Berkshire, England of pious parents, Edward Stennett and Mary (Quelch) Stennett. He attended Wallingford Grammar School. He was also tutored by his father, Edward, and older brother, Jedudah, and learned French, Italian, and Hebrew. Both his father and his brother had written Hebrew grammars. Joseph's heart was turned to Christ at an early age. In 1685, at the age of 22, he moved to London where he worked as a tutor.

In 1688, Joseph Stennett married a daughter of George Guill, a French Protestant refugee. Joseph Stennett was the father of Joseph Stennett, D. D., the grandfather of Dr. Samuel Stennett and Samuel's brother Joseph, the latter whom also had a son named Joseph.

Ministry
In 1690, Joseph was ordained pastor of the Sabbatarian Baptist (Seventh Day Baptist) congregation meeting in London, at Pinner's Hall, where he served until his death in 1713. Hanserd Knollys, among others, spoke at his ordination. The church's first pastor had been Francis Bampfield, who died in 1684 in Newgate Prison. The Pinner's Hall congregation grew to between 120 and 150 members during Stennett's pastorate.

In his early ministry Stennett preached also, on Sabbath evenings, at the Devonshire Square Seventh Day Baptist Church. He mastered Hebrew. Early on, he was tutored by his father, Edward Stennett (died 1690), also a Baptist minister, and author of The Royal Law Contended For (1658) and The Seventh Day Sabbath (1664). He had also corresponded with Baptists in Newport, Rhode Island between 1668 and 1674, encouraging them as they organized the first Seventh Day Baptist Church in America in 1671.

Joseph Stennett was a Particular Baptist, and often supplied pulpit for Sunday churches as well. He was chosen to represent the body of Baptists and other Dissenters in regards to national affairs. Several sermons preached on public occasions were published, and one sermon (National Thanksgiving, 1704) won him the favour of Queen Anne.

Death

After falling ill, Stennett followed the advice of his doctor and retired to the home of his brother-in-law, Mr. Morton, in Knaphill, Buckinghamshire, England. However the advice proved of little avail and he died there in 1713, at the age of 49.

Published works
The writings of Joseph Stennett were collected after his death and published in 1732 in four volumes (The Works Of the late Reverend and Learned Mr. Joseph Stennett: In Five Volumes To which is prefix'd Some Account of his Life, London, 1732). The "fifth" volume was to have included the anti-pedobaptist treatise previously published (in 1704), An Answer to Mr. Russen's Book..., but was not, due to lack of funds. 
His works include:
 Hymns in Commemoration of the Sufferings of our Blessed Saviour Jesus Christ, Compos’d for the Celebration of His Holy Supper, 1697, (second edition revised & expanded 1705, third edition 1709)

 A Version of Solomon's Song of Songs together with the XIVth Psalm, 1697 (second edition, 1703; third edition, 1709)
 An Answer to Mr. David Russen's Book entitled: Fundamentals without a Foundation or a True Picture of the Anabaptists, 1704

 Hymns Compos'd for the Celebration of the Holy Ordinance of Baptism, 1712 (second edition, 1722)

 A translation of Dacier's Plato and other works from the French

 Various sermons

Joseph Stennett was the first significant Baptist hymnwriter. Isaac Watts (who was thirteen years younger than Joseph Stennett) praised Stennett, and included Stennett hymns in his noteworthy Hymns and Spiritual Songs in Three Books, published in 1707.

Hymns written
Another Six Days Work Is Done
Lord, at Thy Table I Behold
Behold the Savior of the World
My Blessed Savior, Is Thy Love
Come Every Pious Heart
Again Our Weekly Labors End
Behold The Grave Where Jesus Lay
Behold The Savior On The Cross
Come Let Us All, Who Here Have Seen
Come Lowly Souls, that mourn
In That Most Dark And Doleful Night
Jehovah We In Hymns Of Praise
Jesus! O Word Divinely Sweet!
Return, My Soul, Enjoy Thy Rest
See How The Willing Converts Trace
The Great Redeemer We Adore
Thou Art All Love My Dearest Lord
Thus Was The Great Redeemer Plung'd
Thus We Commemorate The Day
'Tis Finished, The Redeemer Cries
With Lowly Minds And Lofty Song
Gracious Redeemer, How Divine
Our Lord, When Cloth'd With Mortal Flesh
Lord, All These Works Of Thine
My Soul, Let All Thy Nobler Powers
Immortal Praise Be Given
Whene’er One Sinner Turns to God
I own I love; 'tis no uncomely fire
Blest Day! Ordain'd by God
When the Creator of the world had given
Sacred Body of our Lord, The
When th' ancient world God's patience try'd
O Bless'd Redeemer! in thy side
When from Egyptian slavery The Hebrews were redeem'd
When fam'd Bethesda's waters flow'd
In such a grave as this
See in what grave our Saviour lay

References

Other sources

Seventh Day Baptists in Europe and America, vols I & II, 1910
Thomas Crosby, The History of the English Baptists, 1738, reprinted 1979
John Rippon, A Selection of Hymns from the Best Authors, Intended to be an Appendix to Dr. Watts Psalms and Hymns, 1787
Isaac Watts, Hymns and Spiritual Songs in Three Books, 1707
 reprinted 1962
B. A. Ramsbottom, Through Cloud and Sunshine: Four Generations of Faithful Witness-the story of the  Stennett Family, 1982  
W. T. Whitley, A Baptist Bibliography, vols I & II, 1916
Puritan Pulpit, Fall 1989, Vol 1, No. 3
Charles Spurgeon, Our Own Hymn-Book. Reprinted by Pilgrim Press, N.D.

External links
 Joseph Stennett at the Eighteenth-Century Poetry Archive (ECPA)
Biography at Cyber Hymnal

1663 births
1713 deaths
Christian hymnwriters
English hymnwriters
17th-century English Baptist ministers
Seventh Day Baptists